Network for Astronomy School Education (NASE) is an International Astronomical Union (IAU) Working Group that works on Training Teachers for primary and secondary schools.
In 2007, professor George K. Miley, IAU vice-president, invited Rosa M. Ros to begin exploring the idea of setting up an astronomy program to give primary and secondary school teachers a better preparation in this area of knowledge. The birth of NASE Group occurred when Rosa Maria Ros and Alexandre Costa were sent by UNESCO and IAU to give two courses in Peru and Ecuador in July 2009. Shortly after NASE was officially created on August 2009 during IAU's General Assembly at Rio de Janeiro. From there on more than 80 courses have been presented worldwide.

The topics of "the basic NASE course" are: 
 Positional astronomy
 Solar System
 Exoplanets
 Spectrography
 Photometry
 Spectroscopy
 Determination of absolute magnitude
 Stellar nucleosynthesis
 Stellar evolution 
 Cosmology
NASE classes were designed for developing countries where teachers don't have many financial resources. NASE Working Group members go to these countries for the first time to prepare a local task group that will disseminate astronomy knowledge and inexpensive didactic materials. The main goal is precisely to set up in each country a local group of NASE members who carry on teaching the essential NASE course every year and to create new didactic inexpensive experiments, demonstrations and astronomical instruments.
This has allowed to build a very large repository of educational materials for astronomy with PowerPoint Presentations], animations, articles and lectures, photos, games, simulations websites, interactive programs(e.g. Stellarium) and videos.

NASE Courses 

NASE has now given more than seventy courses mainly in South America, Africa and Asia.

Partnership Courses
NASE has also cooperated with other associations to promote teacher training on astronomy, namely with UNESCO and the European Association for Astronomy Education-EAAE.

See also
 List of astronomical societies

References

External links 
NASE Website
14 Steps to the Universe (book)
Geometry of Light and Light Shadows
Cosmic lights (book)
International Astronomical Union (Official website)

Astronomy organizations
International educational organizations